Nasser Kamalian (born 1931 in Iran) is an Iranian medical scholar who can be considered the father of modern neuropathology in Iran. He has published around 60 major articles in prominent Iranian and international medical journals, and has for 40 years been associated with Tehran University.

Education and career 
Kamalian received his MD degree from Tehran University in 1958, completing a residency in Anatomical Pathology at the same institution in 1964. Remaining at the university he served as a lecturer in Anatomical until 1968, before moving to the University of Wisconsin, USA, from 1969–1974, where he obtained his specialty board in Anatomical Pathology and his sub-specialty board in Neuropathology. He has been a full professor of pathology at Tehran University since 1974.

Alongside his academic career he has held administrative positions, including (inter alia) as founder and head of the pathology department of Shariati Hospital, Dean of Tehran University of Medical Sciences (TUMS), Director of the pathology group of TUMS, member of the High Council of the Iranian Blood Transfusion Organization, and President of Shariati Hospital in Tehran.

Publications 
Dr. Kamalian is the first translator of Robin's Pathological Basis of Diseases into Persian. He has co-edited three major Persian textbooks on pathology and written five handbooks for medical residents and fellows. He has published 43 articles in Persian medical journals and has 20 international publications listed in PubMed.

Selected publications 
 Kamalian N, Abbassioun K, Amirjamshidi A, Shams-Shahrabadi M. Paraganglioma of the filum terminale internum. Report of a case and review of the literature. J Neurol. 1987 Oct; 235(1):56-9. Review. 
 Kamalian N, Ghafoorzadeh D. Squamous cell carcinoma of the cervix, with extension in an in situ fashion into the endometrium. Int J Gynaecol Obstet. 1977; 15(3):267-9. 
 Kamalian N, Keesey RE, ZuRhein GM. Lateral hypothalamic demyelination and cachexia in a case of "malignant" multiple sclerosis. Neurology. 1975 Jan; 25(1): 25-30. 
 Kamalian N, Troyer WG Jr. A case of combined rheumatic heart disease, syphilitic aortitis, and silico-tuberculosis. Wis Med J. 1974 Jan; 73(1): S3-6. 
 Kamalian N, Dudley AW Jr, Beroukhim F. Wolman disease with jaundice and subarachnoid hemorrhage. Am J Dis Child. 1973 Nov; 126(5): 671-5.

References

External links 
 Naser Kamalian profile on Scopus

1931 births
Living people
People from Qom
Iranian pathologists
Academic staff of the University of Tehran